
Gmina Dalików is a rural gmina (administrative district) in Poddębice County, Łódź Voivodeship, in central Poland.

Villages
Gmina Dalików contains the villages and settlements of Bardzynin, Brudnów, Brudnów Stary, Budzynek, Dąbrówka Nadolna, Dalików, Domaniew, Domaniewek, Fułki, Gajówka-Kolonia, Gajówka-Parcel, Gajówka-Wieś, Idzikowice, Kołoszyn, Kontrewers, Krasnołany, Krzemieniew, Kuciny, Madaje Stare, Oleśnica, Psary, Sarnów, Sarnówek, Wilczyca, Zdrzychów and Złotniki.

Neighbouring gminas
Gmina Dalików is bordered by the gminas of Aleksandrów Łódzki, Lutomiersk, Parzęczew, Poddębice and Wartkowice.

References
Polish official population figures 2006

Dalikow
Poddębice County